Bryane Somerton Heaberlin (born November 2, 1993) is an American soccer goalkeeper who last played for Eintracht Frankfurt. She previously played for Turbine Potsdam. She has represented the United States on the under-20 national team and won gold with the team at the 2012 CONCACAF Women's U-20 Championship and 2012 FIFA U-20 Women's World Cup.

Early life
Heaberlin started playing youth soccer in 2002 at the Chargers Soccer Club in Clearwater, Florida. From 2009 until 2010, she played for the Northeast Raiders.

Club career
Heaberlin made 63 appearances for 1. FFC Frankfurt (Known as Eintracht Frankfurt from 2020) after joining from Turbine Potsdam in 2017. After suffering a concussion she agreed a mutual termination of her contract in March 2021 and returned to the United States.

References

External links
 
 U.S. Soccer player profile

American women's soccer players
Living people
1993 births
1. FFC Turbine Potsdam players
1. FFC Frankfurt players
Eintracht Frankfurt (women) players
North Carolina Tar Heels women's soccer players
Soccer players from St. Petersburg, Florida
Frauen-Bundesliga players
United States women's under-20 international soccer players
Women's association football goalkeepers
American expatriate soccer players in Germany